Oliver de la Paz is an American poet and educator. He is the author of four collections of poetry, including Requiem for the Orchard (University of Akron Press, 2010), winner of the Akron Prize for Poetry. His honors include a 2005 New York Foundation for the Arts Fellowship Award and a 2009 GAP Grant from Artist Trust. His work has appeared in literary journals and magazines including Virginia Quarterly Review,  North American Review, Tin House, Chattahoochee Review, and in anthologies such as Asian American Poetry: The Next Generation (University of Illinois Press, 2004).

De la Paz was born in Manila, Philippines, and raised in Ontario, Oregon. He earned a B.S. in biology and a B.A. in English from Loyola Marymount University, and an M.F.A. in creative writing from Arizona State University. He teaches at College of the Holy Cross, and co-chairs the advisory board of Kundiman, a not-for-profit organization dedicated to the promotion of Asian American Poetry.

Published works
 The Boy in the Labyrinth (University of Akron Press, 2019)
 Requiem for the Orchard (University of Akron Press, 2010)
 Furious Lullaby (Southern Illinois University Press, 2007)
 Names Above Houses (Southern Illinois University Press, 2001)

References

External links
 Audio: Oliver de la Paz Reading His Poems for From The Fishouse
 Author Website
 Interview: How a Poem Happens > April 6, 2009 > Oliver de la Paz
 Poem: Verse Daily > 2009 > Self-Portrait with Taxidermy by Oliver de la Paz

American male poets
Living people
Poets from Washington (state)
Western Washington University faculty
American poets of Asian descent
American writers of Filipino descent
Filipino emigrants to the United States
Loyola Marymount University alumni
Arizona State University alumni
Poets from Oregon
People from Manila
People from Ontario, Oregon
Year of birth missing (living people)
21st-century American poets
21st-century American male writers